James Garbarino is an author and professor at Loyola University Chicago. He has specialized in studying what causes violence in children, how they cope with it and how to rehabilitate them. Garbarino has served as consultant or adviser to a wide range of organizations, including the National Committee to Prevent Child Abuse, the National Institute for Mental Health, the American Medical Association, the National Black Child Development Institute, the National Science Foundation, the U.S. Advisory Board on Child Abuse and Neglect, and the FBI. In addition, Garbarino's work is associated with the School of Human Ecology at Cornell University under the leadership of Urie Bronfenbrenner who began Head Start programs in the US.

Academic work
Garbarino has written on the causes of violent behavior in children and how they cope with stress. He has studied the impact of war on children, including children in Kuwait, Iraq, Bosnia, and Croatia. He has also conducted many interviews with children who have been convicted of violent crimes in the United States, concluding that abuse and neglect at an early age are contributing causes to the violent behavior of these children. He has served as an expert witness involving issues of trauma, violence, and abuse in both civil and criminal trials. Garbarino and his coauthors have also conducted many interviews with other high school students and teachers about bullying and social problems at school to help understand ways to improve the school environment.

Garbarino recommends that violence prevention begin at an early age by recognizing underlying causes and addressing them before they expand. He advocates programs that provide assistance to young at-risk children and parents, including a home visiting program that provides home visitors to young mothers at risk to help with child care and provide advice about child rearing. Children who have benefited from this program have reduced drop out and delinquency rates. He has also advised intervention when there are problems in school at a young age with advice and counseling rather than punishment when possible. He believes this is often less expensive and more productive than waiting for problems to get worse.

Works
 Successful Schools and Competent Students (1981)
 The Psychologically Battered Child by James Garbarino, Edna Guttmann, and Janis Wilson Seeley (1986)
 The Future As If It Really Mattered (1986)
 What Children Can Tell Us: Eliciting, Interpreting, and Evaluating Information from Children. with Frances M. Scott (1989)
 Children and Families in the Social Environment (1992)
 Toward A Sustainable Society (1992)
 Raising Children in a Socially Toxic Environment (1995)
 Understanding Abusive Families: An Ecological Approach to Theory and Practice with John Eckenrode (1997)
 Children in Danger: Coping with the Consequences of Community Violence (1998)
 Lost Boys: Why Our Sons Turn Violent and How We Can Save Them (1999)
 And Words Can Hurt Forever: How to Protect Adolescents from Bullying, Harassment, and Emotional Violence with Ellen deLara (2001)
 Parents Under Siege: Why You Are the Solution, Not the Problem, in Your Child’s Life with Claire Bedard (2001)
 Por Que Las Familias Abusan De Sus Hijos with John Eckenrode (2001)
 An Educator's Guide to School-Based Interventions with Ellen de Lara and James M. Cooper (2003)
 See Jane Hit: Why Girls Are Growing More Violent and What We Can Do About It (2006)
 Children and the Dark Side of Human Experience: Confronting Global Realities and Rethinking Child Development (2009)
 Listening to Killers: Lessons Learned from My 20 Years as a Psychological Expert Witness in Murder Cases (2015)

See also
School shooting
School violence
Child abuse
Family support

References

External links
 Luc.edu
 Psychpage.com
 Victoriasanders.com
 Enotalone.com 

21st-century American psychologists
Cornell University faculty
Education issues
Year of birth missing (living people)
Living people